Marc Laho (born 15 January 1965) is a Belgian lyric tenor opera singer.

Biography 

Laho was born in Seraing, Belgium. He studied at the Royal Conservatory of Liège in Belgium and later with Luigi Alva, Alain Vanzo, and Gabriel Bacquier. He made his professional opera debut at the Opéra de Monte-Carlo in 1989 as l'officier in Massenet's Thérèse. In 1992, he participated in the final round of the Pavarotti's international singing competition in Philadelphia.

He sang Gérald in Lakmé co-starring Natalie Dessay in Avignon, Pâris in Offenbach's La Belle Hélène conducted by Nikolaus Harnoncourt in Zurich, and Elvino in La Sonnambula at the Opéra-Comique and the Vienna State Opera.
He performed his first Hoffmann in 2008 at the Grand Théâtre de Genève directed by Olivier Py, then confirmed his interpretation, directed by Nicolas Joel, at the Teatro Regio in Turin. He appeared in the Requiem by Berlioz at the Festival de Saint-Denis conducted by Sir Colin Davis, as well as in Lélio by Berlioz at the Théâtre des Champs-Élysées conducted by Riccardo Muti.

Recently he appeared in The Tales of Hoffmann in Prague, L'attaque du moulin in Bern, Die Fledermaus in Montpellier, La Rondine in Toulon, La Sonnambula in Bonn and Le Duc d'Albe in Antwerp and Ghent.

In September 2012 he could be heard singing the title role in Stradella by César Franck, a world premiere for the reopening of the Royal Opera of Wallonia in Liège. Marc Laho appeared as Fernand in Donizetti's La favorite at the Théâtre des Champs-Élysées in February 2013. In 2018 he appeared as Don José in a video-recorded performance of Bizet's Carmen by the Opéra Royal de Liège.

Roles 

 Daniel Auber
 Gustave III ou le Bal masqué – Gustave III
 Vincenzo Bellini
 I puritani – Lord Arturo Talbo
 La sonnambula – Elvino
 Georges Bizet
 Carmen – Don José
 Les Pêcheurs de perles – Nadir
 François-Adrien Boieldieu
 La Dame blanche – Georges
 Gustave Charpentier
 Louise – King of the Fools
 Ernest Chausson
 Le Roi Arthus – Lyonnel
 Léo Delibes
 Lakmé – Gérald
 Gaetano Donizetti
 Alahor in Granata – Alamar
 Don Pasquale – Ernesto
 La favorite – Fernand
 La fille du régiment – Tonio
 Le Duc d’Albe – Henri de Bruges
 Lucia di Lammermoor – Lord Arturo Bucklaw
 Lucia di Lammermoor – Sir Edgardo di Ravenswood
 Maria Stuarda – Leicester
 Gabriel Fauré
 Pénélope – Antinoüs
 César Franck
 Stradella – Stradella
 Charles Gounod
 Mireille – Vincent
 Jacques-Fromental Halévy
 La Juive – Prince Léopold
 Franz Lehár
 The Merry Widow – Camille de Rosillon
 Jules Massenet
 Manon – Le Chevalier des Grieux
 Thaïs – Nicias
 Jacques Offenbach
 La belle Hélène – Pâris
 La Périchole – Piquillo
 The Tales of Hoffmann – Hoffmann
 Orpheus in the Underworld – Orpheus
 Giacomo Puccini
 La rondine – Ruggero Lastouc
 Gioachino Rossini
 Le comte Ory – Le Comte Ory
 Le siège de Corinthe – Néoclès
 Nino Rota
 Il cappello di paglia di Firenze – Fadinard
 Johann Strauss II
 Die Fledermaus – Alfred
 Ambroise Thomas
 Hamlet – Laërte
 Giuseppe Verdi
 I Lombardi alla prima crociata – Arvino
 La traviata – Alfredo Germont

and many other

Recordings 

 Les Contes d’Hoffmann, Offenbach, Conductor: Patrick Davin, Staging: Olivier Py, Grand Théâtre de Genève, DVD: Bel Air Media, 2008
 Lucie de Lammermoor, Donizetti, Conductor: Evelino Pidò, Opéra National de Lyon, CD: EMI 2002, DVD: Bel Air Media 2002
 Le comte Ory, Rossini, Conductor: Andrew Davis, Staging: Jérôme Savary, Glyndebourne Festival, DVD: NVC Arts (Warner), 1997
 Symphonie No. 3, Ropartz, Conductor: Jean-Yves Ossonce, CD: Timpani, 2011
 Comala/Clair de lune, Jongen, Conductor: Jean-Pierre Haeck, CD: Musique en Wallonie, 2003
 Freyhir, Mathieu, Conductor: Jean-Pierre Haeck, CD: Musique en Wallonie, 2007

References

Living people
1965 births
Belgian operatic tenors
People from Seraing